Structured criticality is a property of complex systems in which small events may trigger larger events due to subtle interdependencies between elements. This often gives rise to a form of stratified chaos where the general behavior of the system can be modeled on one scale while smaller- and larger-scale behaviors remain unpredictable.

For example:

Consider a pile of sand. If you drop one grain of sand on top of this pile every second, the pile will continue to grow in the shape of a cone. The general shape, size, and growth of this cone is fairly easy to model as a function of the rate at which new sand grains are added, the size and shape of the grains, and the number of grains in the pile.

The pile retains its shape because occasionally a new grain of sand will trigger an avalanche which causes some number of grains to slide down the side of the cone into new positions.

These avalanches are chaotic. It is nearly impossible to predict if the next grain of sand will cause an avalanche, where that avalanche will occur on the pile, how many grains of sand will be involved in the event, and so on.

However, the aggregate behavior of avalanches can be modeled statistically with some accuracy. For example, you can reasonably predict the frequency of avalanche events of different sizes.

The avalanches are caused when the impact of a new grain of sand is sufficient to dislodge some group of sand grains. If that group is dislodged then its motion may be sufficient to cause a cascade failure in some neighboring groups, while other groups that are nearby may be strong enough to absorb the energy of the event without being disturbed.

Each group of sand grains can be thought of as a sub-system with its own state, and each sub-system can be made up of other sub-systems, and so on. In this way you can imagine the sand pile as a complex system made up of sub-systems ultimately made up of individual grains of sand (yet another sub-system). Each of these sub-systems are more or less likely to suffer a cascade failure. Those that are likely to fail and reorganize can be said to be in a critical state.

Put another way, the likelihood that any particular sub-system will fail (or experience a particular event) can be called its criticality. (See: Self-organized criticality)

So then, the pile of sand can be viewed as a network of interconnected systems, each with its own criticality. The relationships between these groups impose a structure on this network which has a profound effect on the probability and scope of a cascade failure in response to some other event. In other words, - structured criticality.

Structured criticality is found just about everywhere. Some other examples are:

 Landslides.
 Lightning strikes.
 Earthquakes.
 The knots that appear on a twisted rubber band in a model airplane as the propeller is wound up.
 Rouge Waves

Complex systems theory